Skage is a village in the municipality of Overhalla in Trøndelag county, Norway.

The village lies along the Norwegian County Road 17.  The now-defunct Namsos Line railway ran through this village.  Skage Church is also located in this village.

References

Villages in Trøndelag
Overhalla